Demetris Ioannou born December 8, 1968, is a former international Cypriot football defender and currently a football manager.

Career
He started his career in 1990 from Apollon Limassol and then followed six successful seasons in Anorthosis Famagusta. Also, he played in Olympiakos Nicosia for just six months and he ended his career in AEP Paphos.

International career
He is regarded as one of the greatest Cypriot centre backs of all time and captained the Cyprus National Team for a four-year period.

Personal life
His son, Nicholas Ioannou, was born on November 10, 1995. He plays as a centre defender, and was signed up by Manchester United when he was 11 years old. He  progressed through the ranks at Old Trafford and he was a member of the inaugural UEFA Youth League squad. On April 24, 2014, he signed a 3 year contract with the biggest football club of Cyprus, APOEL Nicosia.

References

External links
 

1968 births
Living people
Apollon Limassol FC players
Anorthosis Famagusta F.C. players
Olympiakos Nicosia players
AEP Paphos FC players
Cypriot footballers
Cyprus international footballers
Greek Cypriot people
Association football defenders
Cypriot football managers
Aris Limassol FC managers